The English Greyhound Derby is the most prestigious race on the British greyhound racing calendar, with a history stretching back to 1927.

It was first held at White City Stadium, but moved to Wimbledon Stadium in 1985, and then Towcester Greyhound Stadium in 2017, Nottingham in 2019 and back to Towcester in 2021. Only four greyhounds have won the event twice, Mick the Miller, Patricias Hope, Rapid Ranger and Westmead Hawk. Trainer Charlie Lister OBE has won the event a record seven times.

History

The first venue of the English Greyhound Derby was at White City Stadium, which had been built for the 1908 London Olympics. Greyhound racing had only recently started to take place there, with the first greyhound race only taking place a couple of weeks prior to the first Derby being run. Entry Badge won the first race to be held, winning a £1000 prize for the dog's trainer, Joe Harmon. Two years later, racing greyhound Mick the Miller became the first dog to win multiple Derbys. The 1940 final was held at Harringay Stadium, due to the outbreak of war.

In 1973, pet food manufacturer Spillers sponsored the race for the first time, the same year that Patricias Hope became the second dog to win the Derby on more than one occasion, one of only two dogs to achieve that at White City Stadium. Spillers continued to sponsor the race, increasing the prize money to £35,000 by 1980. The Daily Mirror took over sponsorship of the race in 1983; the following year the race was held at White City for the last time before that stadium closed, with Whisper Wishes becoming the final dog to win the Derby at its original location.

The Derby was moved to Wimbledon Stadium in 1985, and remained there until 2016. The Daily Mirror continued to be the race's sole sponsor until 1990, when the Sporting Life became co-sponsor. In 1998, bookmaker William Hill became the sole sponsor; in 2006, bookmaker Blue Square took over. William Hill later renewed its involvement with greyhounds and the Wimbledon Stadium with a partnership that lasted until 2016.

The 2016 Derby was the last to be held at Wimbledon following the stadium's closure on 25 March 2017 and the redevelopment of the site for housing by the owner Galliard Homes. This resulted in the Derby being located outside London for the first time as Wimbledon was the last greyhound stadium in the capital.

Charlie Lister holds the record as the most successful trainer at the Derby, having won it on seven occasions. He is hailed as the greatest greyhound trainer of all time, and referred to as the 'Derby King'.

On 30 January 2017, it was announced that the event would relocate to the new greyhound stadium at Towcester Racecourse, for a minimum period of five years but it was switched to Nottingham Greyhound Stadium in 2019 following the closure of Towcester Racecourse in 2018. The 2020 event was rescheduled following a postponement due to the COVID-19 pandemic.

Following the reopening of Towcester Greyhound Stadium, the English Greyhound Derby returned to Towcester for 2021.

Past winners

Statistics

References

 
Recurring sporting events established in 1927
1927 establishments in England
Sport in Nottingham
Greyhound racing competitions in the United Kingdom
Greyhound racing in London
Sport in Northamptonshire